This is a list of individuals who served in the House of Representatives of Nigeria in the 5th National Assembly.

References 

Lists of Members of the House of Representatives (Nigeria)